Urophora congrua is a species of tephritid or fruit flies in the genus Urophora of the family Tephritidae.

Distribution
France, South Germany, Austria.

References

Urophora
Insects described in 1862
Diptera of Europe